John Alexander Key (December 30, 1871 – March 4, 1954) was an American politician who served as a U.S. representative from Ohio for three terms from 1913 to 1919.

Early life and career 
Born in Marion, Ohio, Key attended the public schools. He learned the printer's trade. He was a city letter carrier from 1897 to 1903. He was Recorder of Marion County from 1903 to 1908. He was Secretary to Representative Carl C. Anderson, of Ohio from 1908 to 1912.

Congress 
Key was elected as a Democrat to the Sixty-third, Sixty-fourth, and Sixty-fifth Congresses (March 4, 1913 – March 3, 1919). He served as chairman of the Committee on Pensions (Sixty-third through Sixty-fifth Congresses). He was an unsuccessful candidate for reelection in 1918 to the Sixty-sixth Congress.

Later career and death 
He engaged in the petroleum industry. He served as inspector of Federal prisons from 1934 until his retirement in 1941.

Death
He died in Marion, Ohio, March 4, 1954. He was interred in Marion Cemetery.

Sources

1871 births
1954 deaths
People from Marion, Ohio
Ohio lawyers
Democratic Party members of the United States House of Representatives from Ohio